Adıyaman University is a state university, established in 2006 in Adıyaman province, Turkey.

Departments 
Faculty of Engineering
Faculty of Economics and Managerial Sciences
Faculty of Science and Letters
Faculty of Technology
Faculty of Medicine
Faculty of Educational Sciences
Besni Vocational High School
Gölbaşı Vocational High School
Kahta Vocational High School
Adıyaman Vocational High School

Notable alumni
Melike Günal (born 1998), female weightlifter

External links
Adıyaman University website

References

Educational institutions established in 2006
Universities and colleges in Turkey
State universities and colleges in Turkey
Buildings and structures in Adıyaman Province
2006 establishments in Turkey